The 2015 OFC Champions League Final was the final of the 2014–15 OFC Champions League, the 14th edition of the Oceania Cup, Oceania's premier club football tournament organized by the Oceania Football Confederation (OFC), and the 9th season under the current OFC Champions League name.

The final was played between two New Zealand teams, Auckland City and Team Wellington. It was played at the National Stadium in Suva on 26 April 2015. The winner earned the right to represent the OFC at the 2015 FIFA Club World Cup, entering at the qualifying play-off round.

Auckland City defeated Team Wellington 4–3 on penalties (1–1 after extra time) to win their fifth consecutive and seventh overall OFC club title.

Background
This was the second final to be played as a single match during the OFC Champions League era. The previous single-match final, in 2013, was also the only previous final to feature two New Zealand teams, where Auckland City defeated Waitakere United.

Auckland City were the four-time defending champions. They had played in six previous finals, winning all of them in 2006, 2009, 2011, 2012, 2013, and 2014. For Team Wellington, this was the first time that they reach an OFC club final.

On 16 March 2014, Auckland City defeated Team Wellington 1–0 in the 2013–14 ASB Premiership grand final to be crowned domestic champions. Both teams qualified for the 2014–15 OFC Champions League as they also finished first and second in the regular season. On 19 October 2014, Team Wellington defeated Auckland City 4–3 on penalties (2–2 full-time) in the season-opening ASB Charity Cup. In the 2014–15 ASB Premiership, both teams again finished first and second in the regular season, with the two teams each winning their home match against their final opponent (Team Wellington 4–0 Auckland City on 29 November 2014; Auckland City 3–0 Team Wellington on 15 February 2015).

Road to final

The final stage of the 2014–15 OFC Champions League was played in Fiji.

Note: In all results below, the score of the finalist is given first.

Rules
The final was played as a single match. If tied after regulation, extra time and, if necessary, penalty shoot-out would be used to decide the winner.

Match
Auckland City took the lead in the 14th minute through João Moreira's penalty, but Team Wellington equalized in the 79th minute, when Ian Hogg hammered in a loose ball after a free kick. The match went to extra time, and Auckland City missed the chance to retake the lead when Michael O'Keeffe saved Darren White's penalty, and the match ended 1–1, meaning the title had to be decided by a penalty shoot-out.

In the penalty shoot-out, both teams missed one penalty in the first four rounds, with Tamati Williams saving from Luis Corrales and O'Keeffe saving from Ángel Berlanga. In the fifth round, Hogg sent his penalty over the bar, and Kim Dae-wook converted his shot to give Auckland City the title.

References

External links
OFC Champions League 2015, oceaniafootball.com

2015
1 Final
2014–15 in New Zealand association football
Association football penalty shoot-outs